is a 2013 anime film produced by Gonzo, based on PlatinumGames' 2009 video game, Bayonetta. The film was directed by Fuminori Kizaki with screenplay by Mitsutaka Hirota.

Bloody Fate was the first piece of Bayonetta media to be voiced in Japanese, as opposed to the first game being voiced exclusively by an English cast. The film was released in Japanese theaters on November 23, 2013, and later released on DVD and Blu-ray Disc on February 14, 2014. The film has been licensed in North America by Funimation and the English dub features most of the same voice cast from the game reprising their respective roles.

After the positive reception of the film, the Japanese cast of Bloody Fate returned to lend their voices to the characters in Bayonetta 2, as well as the special Wii U edition of the first game in 2014.

Plot

As an adaption of Bayonetta rather than a direct translation, Bloody Fate's storyline follows the events and characters of the game with some slight changes to locales, order and details. After waking from 500 years of slumber at the bottom of a lake, with no memory of her life before, the Umbra witch Bayonetta embarks on a journey to rediscover her identity and her past. Battling the hordes of angelic-themed monsters (she calls them "ghosts") that stand in her way, Bayonetta's journey takes her to the isolated European town of Vigrid, where she confronts the last Lumen Sage, Balder. This deranged sage sees the world as irredeemably corrupt and wishes to destroy it. After an epic battle in which both summon celestial monsters, Bayonetta kills Balder.

Cast

Production
Bloody Fate was created by the anime studio Gonzo. Ai Yokoyama was responsible for designing the main characters of Bloody Fate based on the original Bayonetta character designs by Mari Shimizaki, who also supervised the project. Hiroya Iijima was in charge of the angel enemy designs, also based on original artwork for the game.

Mai from Avex Entertainment contributed the theme song, entitled  "Night, I Stand". Other music for the film was composed by Jun Abe and Masato Kazune, with some additional pieces being provided by reworked versions of tracks from the game.

For the English-localized version of the film, FUNimation Entertainment contacted Jonathan Klein and Los Angeles-based New Generation Pictures to handle the production and requested that as many video game cast members as possible reprise their roles. Since Bayonetta voice actress Hellena Taylor had relocated back to the UK, Klein recorded her voice separately at The Egg Recording Studio located at Shepperton Studios in Surrey, England.

Release
Bayonetta: Bloody Fate was released for a limited theatrical run in Japan on the November 23, 2013. The film also received a home video release for DVD and Blu-ray on February 14, 2014. Madman Entertainment have licensed the film in Australia. Funimation has licensed the film in North America.

A manga adaptation illustrated by Mizuki Sakakibara was published in two parts in Kodansha's Bessatsu Shōnen Magazine on November 9, 2013, and December 9, 2013, respectively.

Reception

Richard Eisenbeis of Kotaku praised the film for its beautiful action and streamlined storyline, calling it "the most 90s movie I have seen in a decade" and "even more over-the-top than the game was."

Notes

References

External links

2013 anime films
Adventure anime and manga
Anime films based on video games
Bayonetta
Comics based on films
Fantasy anime and manga
Films about witchcraft
Films based on Sega video games
Films directed by Fuminori Kizaki
Funimation
Gonzo (company)
Japanese animated films
Kodansha manga
Shōnen manga